Kabary Salem (born 12 February 1968) is an Egyptian former professional boxer who competed from 1997 to 2005 and challenged for the WBO super-middleweight title in 2004.

In December 2020, he was arrested in Egypt and extradited to the United States for the murder of his daughter in Staten Island, New York in October 2019.

Amateur career
He competed at the 1992 Summer Olympics and the 1996 Summer Olympics. Salem won a gold medal in the light-middleweight division at the 1991 All-Africa Games.

Professional career
Salem is regarded as one of the dirtiest fighters of all time for his persistent headbutts, particularly in his bouts against Randie Carver (Resulting in Carver's death), Mario Veit, and Joe Calzaghe.

Professional boxing record

References

External links

Living people
1968 births
Sportspeople from Cairo
Egyptian male boxers
African Games gold medalists for Egypt
African Games medalists in boxing
Boxers at the 1992 Summer Olympics
Boxers at the 1996 Summer Olympics
Olympic boxers of Egypt
Competitors at the 1991 All-Africa Games
Light-middleweight boxers